Thomas Joseph Roulent (10 February 1918 – 25 March 2005) was an Australian rules footballer who played with North Melbourne and South Melbourne in the Victorian Football League (VFL).

Roulent's career with North Melbourne was interrupted by his service in the Australian Army during World War II. In 1946 he moved to South Melbourne.

In June 1947, Roulent was appointed as coach of Border United in Corowa, NSW that played in the Ovens and Murray Football League but South Melbourne refused to clear Roulent and he played out the 1947 VFL season at the Lakeside Oval.

Roulent was appointed as coach of the Jeparit Football Club from 1948 and he continued coached them through 1950.

Roulent was captain-coach of Griffith Football Club from 1952 to 1954 and coached them to the 1952 South West Football League (New South Wales) premiership.

Roulet's grandfather, Steven Roulet played with North Melbourne too.

References

External links 

1918 births
2005 deaths
Australian rules footballers from Melbourne
North Melbourne Football Club players
Sydney Swans players
People from West Melbourne, Victoria
Australian Army personnel of World War II
Australian rules football coaches
Military personnel from Melbourne